Giancola is a surname. Notable people with the surname include:

 Dan Giancola, placekicker in the Canadian Football League
 David Giancola, American filmmaker
 Donato Giancola, American artist
 Rick Giancola, American football coach
 Sammi Giancola, American television personality
 Sandra Giancola, Argentine fencer
 Silvana Giancola, Argentine fencer

Italian-language surnames